Huiji Temple is a Buddhist temple located on Mount Putuo, in Zhoushan, Zhejiang, China. Huiji Temple is commonly called the temple on the Buddha Summit and it is the third largest Buddhist temple on Mount Putuo, after Puji Temple and Fayu Temple.

History

Originally it was just a stone pagoda with a Buddhist statue inside. It was built in the Ming dynasty (1368–1644) by renowned monk Yuanhui. And in 1793 during the Qianlong period of the Qing dynasty (1644–1911), halls such as the Yuantong Hall, Jade Emperor Hall and Dining Hall were added and formed the temple. In 1907, in the reign of Guangxu Emperor, monk Dehua brought the Tripitaka to the temple and at that time it became one of the largest Buddhist temples on Mount Putuo.

On May 3, 1949, Chiang Kai-shek visited Puji Temple and Huiji Temple before he settled down in Taiwan.

During the Cultural Revolution, the Gang of Four presided over the destruction of thousands of temples. The Meditation Hall was demolished by the Red Guards. The People's Liberation Army resided in the temple.

After the 3rd Plenary Session of the 11th Central Committee of the Chinese Communist Party, according to the national policy of free religious belief, the temple reactivated its religious activities. The Guanyin Hall was erected in 1988 and the Free Life Pond was established in 1992. Huiji Temple has been designated as a National Key Buddhist Temple in Han Chinese Area by the State Council of China.

Architecture

Unlike other Buddhist temples, Huiji Temple has a unique layout with all major halls built along a horizontal line, a typical landscape architectural style in eastern Zhejiang.

Mahavira Hall
In the middle is Sakyamuni, statues of Ananda and Kassapa Buddha stand on the left and right sides of Sakyamuni's statue. The statues of the Twenty Protective Devas stand on both sides of the hall. At the back of Sakyamuni is the statue of Guanyin.

Guanyin Hall

References

Bibliography
 

Buddhist temples on Mount Putuo
Buildings and structures in Zhoushan
Tourist attractions in Zhoushan
1793 establishments in China
18th-century Buddhist temples
Religious buildings and structures completed in 1793